Guntin is a municipality in Lugo province in Galicia in north-west Spain.

External links 
 

Municipalities in the Province of Lugo